Sarah "Sallie" Lane (ca 1822 – 19 August 1899) was an English actress, playwright and theatre manager. She was known as "The Queen of Hoxton".

The daughter of William Borrow and Sarah Fowles, she was born Sarah Borrow in London. She began performing as a singer and dancer at the age of seventeen under the stage name Sarah Wilton.

In 1843, she married Sam Lane, the manager of the Britannia Theatre.  From 1873 to 1881, she wrote or translated from French eight melodramas that were presented at the theatre, including The Faithless Wife and Bad Josephine. Lane presented the works of at least six women playwrights, including Melinda Young. She also took on the role of principal boy in the theatre's productions.

Following her husband's death in 1872, Lane managed the theatre until her own death at the age of 77. During the 1880s and 1890s, she regularly appeared in the theatre's pantomimes.

References 

1820s births
1899 deaths
English women dramatists and playwrights
English stage actresses
English theatre managers and producers
English translators
19th-century British translators
19th-century English women
19th-century English businesspeople